Sam Prince may refer to:
 Sam Prince (restaurateur), (born 1983) an Australian entrepreneur
 Sam Prince (journalist), a journalist with Heavy.com
 Sam Prince (TV personality), a cast member on the Made in Chelsea reality television show